Beadlam is a village and civil parish in the Ryedale district of North Yorkshire, England. According to the 2001 census it had a population of 250, reducing to 229 at the Census 2011. Beadlam is halfway between Helmsley and Kirkbymoorside on the A170.

The village is unusual in that it is directly joined onto another village, Nawton, and is commonly given the name Nawton Beadlam. The village has a secondary school Ryedale School and Nawton, the village it is attached to, has a primary school, Nawton Primary School.

The village has a fish and chip shop, which is popular with the students returning from Ryedale School, and a bus stop which provides bus service connections to most of North Yorkshire including major cities and coastal towns in the area including York, Scarborough and Bridlington.

Beadlam was historically a township in the ancient parish of Kirkdale.  It became a separate civil parish in 1866, but remains part of the ecclesiastical parish of Kirkdale.  St Gregory's Minster, the parish church in Kirkdale, has been in use since before the Norman Conquest. Its daughter church of St Hilda's in Beadlam, built in 1882–3, serves as the church of a local Ecumenical Partnership between Methodists and Anglicans.

 west of the village is Beadlam Roman villa, which was excavated in 1969 revealing two 4th-century rectangular buildings, the northernmost of which was fitted with a hypocaust overlain by a tessellated floor.

References

External links

Villages in North Yorkshire
Civil parishes in North Yorkshire